Delhi Hurricanes RFC is an Indian rugby union club based in New Delhi, India. They currently participate in the All India & South Asia Rugby Tournament.

The team plays in Red and Blue or in Black for all games.

History
Delhi Hurricanes Rugby Football Club was formed in July, 2004 and is affiliated with North India RFU, which is part of the Indian RFU.

Delhi Hurricanes have given more than 35 players to Indian National Team by now & hopefully at current pace, we will provide more & more players who could represent Indian Team in near future.

After winning Division II Trophy, at the Callaghan Cup in 2009, the Delhi Hurricanes are improving rapidly, they reached the 5th place in the All India 2010, in year (2011), they lost against the winner of the competition in the semi-final, They came 2nd in 2014, 3rd in 2015, 2nd again in 2016, Women's team were runner up in the inaugural All India 15s tournament too played in Kolkata.  In 2017, they made a history and became 1st club in India's history who won All India and South Asia Rugby Tournament in both Men's and Women's category in the same year.

On 31 July 2011, we inaugurated the first full-time dedicated rugby field in the country and the 1st Rugby Academy in India which started 1 October 2011.

Delhi Hurricanes became ranked 1 in India in Rugby Sevens after winning the All India 7s that they host in the end of October 2011. They won again in Srinagar, J&K after beating Jungle Crows in the finals.

Squad
Squad to be announced.

References

External links
Delhi Hurricanes RFC

Indian rugby union teams
Sports clubs in Delhi
Rugby clubs established in 2004
2004 establishments in Delhi